Thomas Davidson (born November 10, 1963) is an American comedian and actor. He was an original cast member on the sketch comedy TV show In Living Color, Mitchell on Between Brothers (1997-1999), Dexter on Malcolm & Eddie (1999-2000), Oscar Proud on The Proud Family (2001-2005) & its 2022 revival, Rushon in Booty Call (1997), Womack in Bamboozled (2000), Black Dynamite (2009) and its subsequent television series. In 2022, Davidson appeared on Storybound reading from his book, Living in Color: What's Funny about Me.

Early years
Born Anthony Reed in Greenville, Mississippi, Davidson was abandoned in the trash at 18 months old, before being rescued by the woman who became his adoptive mother. He was a child of an interracial adoption, being that his adoptive parents are white. His parents changed his name to Thomas Davidson when they adopted him. He has two older white siblings, Michael and Beryle.  He and his family had moved from Colorado to Wyoming to Oregon by the time he was five years old.

His parents divorced when he was five years old, and his mother and the children moved to Washington, D.C. They later moved to Wheaton, Maryland, then the neighborhood of Rosemary Hills in Silver Spring, and then Takoma Park. He attended Rosemary Hills Elementary School, Sligo Middle School, and Bethesda-Chevy Chase High School, in Bethesda, Maryland. After graduating in 1981, he studied communications and interned at the radio station of the University of the District of Columbia for one semester. He had jobs in the kitchen of the Walter Reed National Military Medical Center, cleaning at Roy Rogers, bussing tables at an IHOP in Wheaton, and working in the storeroom of Hechinger in Hyattsville, Maryland.

Early career
Davidson started his career as a stand-up comedian in 1986, when a childhood friend convinced him to perform stand-up at The Penthouse strip club in Park View, Washington, D.C. He continued performing in various comedy clubs throughout the Washington Metropolitan region, Baltimore, and Philadelphia. He opened concerts for Patti LaBelle, Starpoint, and Kenny G. He performed on a fundraising telethon for WHMM in 1987.

Davidson won an amateur stand-up competition at the Apollo Theater in 1987. Soon afterwards, he moved to North Hollywood, California, where he met Martin Lawrence, who lived in his building. He performed at the Comedy Store, where Robert Townsend heard of him and asked him to be the warm-up comic for an HBO special. After performing at Luther Vandross and Anita Baker shows, he appeared on the Arsenio Hall Show.

Filmography

Film

Television

Comedy specials

Book
 Davidson, Tommy; Teicholz, Tom (2020). Living in Color. Kensington Publishing. .

References

External links
The Tommy Davidson
Tommy Davidson Music

1963 births
African-American male actors
African-American male comedians
American male comedians
21st-century American comedians
American sketch comedians
American stand-up comedians
American male voice actors
American male television actors
American male film actors
American adoptees
Bethesda-Chevy Chase High School alumni
Living people
People from Rolling Fork, Mississippi
People from Greenville, Mississippi
People from Wheaton, Maryland
People from Silver Spring, Maryland
People from Takoma Park, Maryland
Male actors from Mississippi
University of the District of Columbia alumni
21st-century African-American people
20th-century African-American people